Samsø Airport is an airport on Samsø, Denmark.

References

Airports in Denmark
Transport in the Central Denmark Region
Buildings and structures in Samsø Municipality